Ibrahim Aqil Kamal (born April 14, 1979 in Amman), more commonly known as Ibrahim Aqil, is a Jordanian taekwondo practitioner, who competed in the men's heavyweight category. He captured two bronze medals in the over-84 kg division at the Asian Taekwondo Championships (1998 and 2004), and represented his nation Jordan at the 2004 Summer Olympics.

Ibrahim qualified for the Jordanian squad in the men's heavyweight class (80 kg) at the 2004 Summer Olympics in Athens, by placing third and granting a berth from the Asian Olympic Qualifying Tournament in Bangkok, Thailand. He defeated Denmark's Zakaria Asidah and Vietnam's Nguyen Van Hung in the prelims, before falling behind two-meter-tall local favorite Alexandros Nikolaidis of Greece in the semifinal match with a score of 3–6. As his formidable Greek opponent moved forward into the final, Ibrahim offered a chance for Jordan's first Olympic medal with a more satisfying victory over Kazakhstan's Adilkhan Sagindykov by a marginal judging decision in the repechage rounds, but slipped his chance in a 2–6 defeat to French fighter Pascal Gentil for the bronze, relegating Ibrahim to fourth place.

References

External links

1979 births
Living people
Jordanian male taekwondo practitioners
Olympic taekwondo practitioners of Jordan
Taekwondo practitioners at the 2004 Summer Olympics
Sportspeople from Amman
Asian Games medalists in taekwondo
Taekwondo practitioners at the 1998 Asian Games
Asian Games silver medalists for Jordan
Medalists at the 1998 Asian Games
Asian Taekwondo Championships medalists
20th-century Jordanian people